Khenpo Sherab Sangpo

Khenpo Sherab Sangpo is the Spiritual Director of Bodhicitta Sangha | Heart of Enlightenment Institute in Minneapolis, Minnesota, USA. He was trained by Khenpo Petse Rinpoche and Jigme Phuntsok Rinpoche, two of the greatest masters of the Nyingma tradition in recent history. He was invited to teach at Chökyi Nyima Rinpoche's Ka-Nying Shedrup Ling monastery, where he gave lectures to both Tibetan monks and Western students at the Centre for Buddhist Studies.

Biography
Khenpo (tib. literally "wise one" a title equivalent to a western Ph.D.)is the spiritual adviser of the Bodhicitta Sangha. He was first invited to Minnesota to teach under the auspices of the Rimé Foundation

“Khenpo Sherab Sangpo studied under the lord of refuge Khenchen Padma Tsewang Rinpoche…and with numerous masters of all traditions. He has taught the profound Dharma of sutra and mantra to students of numerous nationalities. This teacher should be treated with reverence and respect. Doing so will bring goodness in this life and the next and establish a profound connection with the Buddha’s teachings.”

- Katok Getsé Rinpoche

Khenpo Sherab Sangpo began his studies in Tibet with the famed master Petsé Rinpoche, with whom he studied for over twenty years. He became a monk at the age of seven at Gyalwa Phukhang Monastery, a branch of Dilgo Khyentse Rinpoche’s Sechen Monastery. Under Petsé Rinpoche's guidance, he first studied Tibetan Buddhist ritual, eventually becoming one of the monastery's ritual leaders and chant masters. Even at a young age, he was renowned for his ability to memorize the vast number of texts used at the monastery and his command of Tibetan Buddhist ritual.

Recognizing his great potential, Petsé Rinpoche enrolled his student in the monastery’s monastic college, Ngedon Shedrup Targye Ling, when he was only thirteen years old. For years, the only task his master gave him was to memorize the countless texts that form the core of the Buddhist education system. Only once he had memorized them all and could recite them from memory did he go on to receive teachings on their meaning. A tireless teacher, Petsé Rinpoche often taught day after day for months on end, without taking a single day off. He also taught the monks himself, which is extremely rare for such a high lama. Khenpo studied for years in this manner, receiving teachings on the entire range of Buddhist philosophy and practice.

Though he has mastered virtually every aspect of Buddhist philosophy and practice, Khenpo Sherab Sangpo is especially renowned for his knowledge of Madhyamaka philosophy, the writings of the great Rimé master Ju Mipham Rinpoche and Buddhist Tantra. Concerning the latter, his expertise comes not only from his knowledge of the Tantric scriptures, but also through his mastery of monastic ritual and the years he has spent meditating in retreat. He is continually requested to teach on these topics by high lamas, monastic colleges and by his growing number of Western students.

In addition, Petsé Rinpoche also gave him extensive teachings on the so-called “five sciences.” which include astrology, poetry, medicine and grammar. Khenpo Sherab Sangpo is renowned for his knowledge of these topics,  To this day, monks and practitioners seek him out not only to teach the subtleties of Buddhist thought and practice, but also to give astrology readings and consult him on other such topics. This range of mastery is extremely rare. To complete training in any one area takes years of dedicated study and practice. Thus, to have mastered these five sciences, in addition to Buddhist philosophy, ritual and meditative practice, is an incredible achievement.

In a further recognition of his talents and realization, [Petsé Rinpoche] appointed him as his personal teaching assistant when Khenpo was only 19. For years, he acted as his master’s “kyorpon,” a teaching assistant who leads review sessions that supplement the main class being taught. He accompanied his teacher as he traveled throughout Tibet, Nepal and India, often giving teachings in his stead at monasteries that had invited Petsé Rinpoche to teach.

In addition to the rigorous academic training in the monastic college, Petsé Rinpoche locked the doors of the monastery for three months every year and allowed no outsiders in. During this time, he led his monks in strict meditation retreat. This allowed the Khenpo to deepen his understanding of the Buddha’s teachings through meditation. The decades he spent with Petsé Rinpoche allowed him to complete years of meditation retreat. Unfortunately, this strict and demanding form of training has virtually died out, even in Tibet. Khenpos who have received such training hold a special place in the Tibetan monastic world.

After his decades of study with Petsé Rinpoche, Khenpo Sherab Sangpo traveled to Larung Gar Monastery in a remote area in North-Eastern Tibet to study under the great lama Jigme Phuntsok Rinpoche. He spent six years with this master furthering his studies, at the end of which his abilities as a teacher were again recognized formally by the monastery and his teachers. He also received rare teachings, such as The Treasury of Precious Revelations (Rinchen Terdzöd), from great Rimé masters like Dilgo Khyentsé Rinpoche and Trulshik Rinpoche, both of whom are root gurus of Tenzin Gyatso the Dalai Lama. In this way, he trained under many of the most renowned lamas in the Buddhist tradition and has been recognized many times as a lama of the highest order.

Following his time in Larung Gar, he returned to his home monastery. Shortly thereafter, Petsé Rinpoche gave him a letter of introduction and sent him alone to receive teachings from the famed meditation hermit Adzom Druktrul Rinpoche. From this meditation master, he received the most secret and profound teachings of the Dzogchen tradition, instructions that are forbidden from being written down or transmitted to more than one student at a time. These teachings are known as Nyong-tri, which means “experiential instructions.” In this style of teaching, short, direct instructions are given one-on-one to a student, who then immediately puts them into practice in strict retreat. The next phase of instructions are only given once the student has encountered certain “signs” that show he or she has directly experienced the depth of the teachings.

Practicing in this manner, Khenpo Sherab Sangpo received the entire “hearing lineage” of the Dzogchen teachings from one of the greatest masters in Tibet. At the end of this period, Adzom Drukpa Rinpoche recognized that his student had truly mastered the teachings. He then commanded Khenpo to uphold all the Buddha’s teachings, formally empowering him to teach all aspects of sutra and tantra, give empowerments, and work for the benefit of others using whatever methods are appropriate. This great honor is a testament to the fact that the Khenpo has mastered not only the theory of Buddhist philosophy and practice, but has also had direct experiential realization of the teachings as well. 

In the late 1990s, Chokyi Nyima Rinpoche requested Petsé Rinpoche to send his most learned and accomplished khenpo to teach at his monastery in Kathmandu. Petsé Rinpoche responded by sending Khenpo Sherab Sangpo, who then spent four years teaching both Western students and Tibetan monks at Ka-Nying Shedrub Ling Monastery, which is one of the largest monasteries outside Tibet. Though the khenpo is renowned for his ability to teach virtually any topic, he is especially known for his knowledge of the tantras and his mastery of the writings of the great 19th century Rimé master Ju Mipham. During this time, he gave numerous teachings at the Center for Buddhist Studies and Ka-Nying Shedrub Ling Monastery, including Mipham’s commentaries on Nagarjuna’s Fundamental Knowledge of the Middle Way, Chandrakirti’s Entrance to the Middle Way, Shantarakshita’s Ornament of the Middle Way, and Longchenpa’s Dispelling the Darkness of the Ten Directions, a Commentary on the Guhyagarbha Tantra.

In short, Khen Rinpoche Sherab Sangpo has received a wealth of teachings from some of the greatest Buddhist masters of the century. His innate abilities and intensive training allowed him to master these teachings, both in terms of theoretical knowledge and experiential realization. For this reason, his knowledge and realization have been recognized time and again by some of the most respected masters in the Tibetan tradition.

References

External links
Bodhichitta Sangha
Sherab Sangpo's Youtube Channel

This article uses GFDL-licensed material from the RangjungYesheWiki article Biography of Khenpo Sherab Sangpo.

Year of birth missing (living people)
Living people
Nyingma lamas